The following is  a list of restaurants in Cambridge, Massachusetts:

 Charlie's Kitchen
 Club Passim
 Grendel's Den
 Legal Sea Foods
 The Middle East
 Café Pamplona
 The Plough and Stars
 Rialto
 Tasty Sandwich Shop
 Toscanini's
 Upstairs On the Square
 Veggie Galaxy
 Yume Wo Katare

Cambridge, Massachusetts
Restaurants